The Samuel Eliot Morison bibliography contains a list of books and articles written by American historian Samuel Eliot Morison.

Books
The following is a list of books written by Samuel Eliot Morison, arranged chronologically.

 Life and Letters of Harrison Gray Otis. 2 vols. Boston: Houghton Mifflin, 1913.
 A History of the Constitution of Massachusetts. Boston: Wright & Potter, 1917.
 
 A Prologue to American History: An Inaugural Lecture. Oxford: Clarendon Press, 1922.
 Sources and Documents Illustrating the American Revolution, 1764–1788, and the Formation of the Federal Constitution. Oxford: Clarendon Press, 1923.
 The Class Lives of Samuel Eliot and Nathaniel Homes Morison, Harvard 1839. Boston: Privately printed, 1926.
 Oxford History of the United States. 2 vols. Oxford: Oxford University Press, 1927.
 An Hour of American History: From Columbus to Coolidge. Philadelphia: J. B. Lippincott & Co., 1929.
 Builders of the Bay Colony. Boston: Houghton Mifflin, 1930.
 The Growth of the American Republic 2 vols. Oxford: Oxford University Press, 1930.
 
 Historical Background for the Massachusetts Bay Tercentenary in 1930. Boston: Massachusetts Bay Tercentenary, Inc., 1928, 1930.
 Historical Markers Erected by Massachusetts Bay Colony Tercentenary Commission. Texts of Inscriptions As Revised By Samuel Eliot Morison. Boston: Commonwealth of Massachusetts, 1930.
 The Proprietors of Peterborough, New Hampshire. Peterborough: Historical Society, 1930.
 The Young Man Washington. Cambridge: Harvard University Press, 1932.
 The Founding of Harvard College. Cambridge: Harvard University Press, 1935.
 The Events of the Year MDCCCCXXXV. Boston: Merrymount Press, 1936.
 Harvard College in the Seventeenth Century. 2 vols. Cambridge: Harvard University Press, 1936.
 The Puritan Pronaos. New York: New York University Press, 1936.
 
 Three Centuries of Harvard, 1636–1936. Cambridge: Harvard University Press, 1936.
 The Pilgrim Fathers: Their Significance in History. Boston: Merrymount Press, 1937.
 The Ancient Classics in a Modern Democracy. New York: Oxford University Press, 1939.
 Doctor Morison's Farewell to the Colonial Society of Massachusetts. Boston: Merrymount Press, 1939.
 The Second Voyage of Christopher Columbus. New York: Oxford University Press, 1939.
 Portuguese Voyages to America in the Fifteenth Century. Cambridge: Harvard University Press, 1940.
 Admiral of the Ocean Sea. 2 vols. Boston: Little, Brown and Company, 1942.
 History As A Literary Art. Boston: Old South Association, 1946.
 History of United States Naval Operations in World War II. 15 vols. Boston: Little, Brown and Company, 1947–62.
 These Forty Years. Boston: Privately printed, 1948. (Address to the 40th Reunion, Harvard Class of 1908)
 Ropemakers of Plymouth. Boston: Houghton Mifflin, 1950.
 Of Plymouth Plantation, 1620–1647. Editor. New York: Knopf, 1952.
 By Land and By Sea. New York: Knopf, 1953.
 Christopher Columbus, Mariner. Boston: Little, Brown and Company, 1955.
 Freedom in Contemporary Society. Boston: Little, Brown and Company, 1956.
 The Story of the 'Old Colony' of New Plymouth, 1620–1692. New York: Knopf, 1956.
 Nathaniel Homes Morison. Baltimore: Peabody Institute, 1957.
 American Contributions to the Strategy of World War II. London: Oxford University Press, 1958.
 Strategy and Compromise. Boston: Little, Brown and Company, 1958.
 William Hickling Prescott. Boston: Massachusetts Historical Society, 1958.
 John Paul Jones: A Sailor's Biography. Boston: Little, Brown and Company, 1959.
 A New and Fresh English Translation of the Letter of Columbus Announcing the Discovery of America. Madrid: Graficas Yagues, 1959.
 The Story of Mount Desert Island, Maine. Boston: Little, Brown and Company, 1960.
 The Scholar in American: Past, Present, and Future. New York: Oxford University Press, 1961.
 Introduction to Whaler Out of New Bedford. New Bedford: Old Dartmouth Historical Society, 1962.
 
 Harvard Guide to American History. Cambridge: Harvard University Press, 1963. (with Arthur Meier Schlesinger, Frederick Merk, Arthur Meier Schlesinger, Jr., and Paul Herman Buck)
 A History of the Constitution of Massachusetts. Boston: Special Commission on Revision of the Constitution, 1963.
 The Two Ocean War. Boston: Little, Brown and Company, 1963.
 The Caribbean as Columbus Saw It. Boston: Little, Brown and Company, 1964. (with Mauricio Obregon)
 Vistas of History. New York: Knopf, 1964.
 
 Spring Tides. Boston: Houghton Mifflin, 1965.
 Old Bruin: Commodore Matthew Calbraith Perry, 1796–1858. Boston: Little, Brown and Company, 1967.
 Life in Washington a Century and a Half Ago. Washington, DC: Cosmos Club, 1968.
 Harrison Gray Otis, 1765–1848: The Urbane Federalist. Boston: Houghton Mifflin, 1969.
 The European Discovery of America. 2 vols. New York: Oxford University Press, 1971–1974.
 Samuel de Champlain: Father of New France. Boston: Little, Brown and Company, 1972.
 Francis Parkman. Boston: Massachusetts Historical Society, 1973.
 The Conservative American Revolution. Washington, DC: Society of the Cincinnati, 1976.

Articles
The following is a list of articles written by Samuel Eliot Morison, arranged chronologically.

1900s

 "The Kremlin of Moscow". Horae Scholasticae 36 (1902): 26–28.

1910s

 "The First National Nominating Convention". American Historical Review 17 (1912): 744–63.
 "The Massachusetts Embassy to Washington, 1815". Proceedings of the Massachusetts Historical Society 48 (1914–15): 343–51.
 "DuPont, Tallyrand, and the French Spoilations". Proceedings of the Massachusetts Historical Society 49 (1915–16): 63–79.
 "The Struggle Over the Adoption of the Massachusetts Constitution, 1780". Proceedings of the Massachusetts Historical Society 50 (1916–17): 353–411.
 "The Vote of Massachusetts on Summoning a Constitutional Convention, 1776–1916". Proceedings of the Massachusetts Historical Society 50 (1916–17): 241–49.
 "Ephraim Eliot's Private Report of the Class of 1780". Publications of the Colonial Society of Massachusetts 19 (1918): 290–95.
 "Harvard in the Colonial Wars, 1675–1748". Harvard Graduates' Magazine 26 (1918): 554–74.
 "The Eastern Baltic: (I) The Peace Conference and the Baltic; (II) Latvia; (III) Latvia, Continued; (IV) Esthonia; (V) Finland". The New Europe 12 (1919): 77–82, 127–32, 155–59, 200–205, 270–75.
 "The Property of Harrison Gray Otis, Loyalist". Publications of the Colonial Society of Massachusetts 14 (1919): 320–50.

1920s

 "The Education of John Marshall". Atlantic Monthly 126 (July 1920): 45–54.
 "The New Baltic Republics: (I) Esthonia and Latvia: (II) Lithuania and Finland". The Youth's Companion (7 October, 28 October 1920.)
 "Remarks on Economic Conditions in Massachusetts in 1780". Publications of the Colonial Society of Massachusetts 20 (1920): 191–92.
 : 9–47; Washington Historical Quarterly 12 (1921–22): 166–201.
 "Custom–House Records in Massachusetts as a Source of History". Proceedings of the Massachusetts Historical Society 54 (1920–21): 324–31.
 "Memoir of Alden Bradford". Proceedings of the Massachusetts Historical Society 55 (1921–22): 153–64.
 "Memoir of Edward Henry Clement". Proceedings of the Massachusetts Historical Society 56 (1922–23): 57–68.
 The Commerce of Boston on the Eve of the Revolution. Proceedings of the American Antiquarian Society New Series 31: 24–51. 1923
 "Liberty and the Constitution". Proceedings of the Massachusetts Society of Sons of the Revolution (1923): 91–121.
 "The Old American Merchant Marine". The Landmark 5 (1923): 793–99.
 "Dr. Amos Windship, 1745–1813, The Biography of a Rascal". Publications of the Colonial Society of Massachusetts 25 (1924): 141–71.
 "Extracts from the Commonplace Book of Ephraim Eliot and from Newspapers Relating to Seth Hudson and Joshua Howe". Publications of the Colonial Society of Massachusetts 25 (1924): 40–43.
 "The Log of the Pilgrim, 1781–1782". Publications of the Colonial Society of Massachusetts 25 (1924): 94–124.
 "The Origins of the Monroe Doctrine, 1775–1823". Economica 1 (February 1924): 27–51.
 "The Will of a Boston Slave". Publications of the Colonial Society of Massachusetts 25 (1924): 253–54.
 "An American Professor's Reflections on Oxford". London Spectator (7 November, 14 November 1925).
 "Impressions of Harvard After Oxford". Harvard Alumni Bulletin 28 (1925–26): 917–20.
 "Sir Charles Vaughan's Viaticum of 1826". Proceedings of the Massachusetts Historical Society 59 (1925–26): 377–414.
 "Charles Bagot's Notes on Housekeeping and Entertaining in Washington, 1819". Publications of the Colonial Society of Massachusetts 26 (1927): 438–46.
 "New England and the Opening of the Columbia River Salmon Trade". Oregon Historical Quarterly 28 (1927): 111–32.
 "Nova Albion and New England". Oregon Voter (14 Aug. 1926), and Oregon Historical Quarterly 28 (1927): 1–17.
 "Robert Morris". Harvard Business School Alumni Bulletin (15 December 1927.).
 "Did William Bradford Leave Leyden Before the Pilgrims". Proceedings of the Massachusetts Historical Society 61 (1927–28): 34–39.0
 "The Clipper Ships," in Albert Bushnell Hart (Ed.), Commonwealth History of Massachusetts. 5 vols. New York: State History Co., 1927–30: 4, 434–72.
 "Forcing the Dardanelles in 1810". New England Quarterly (1928): 208–25.
 "History". The History and Traditions of Harvard College. Cambridge, MA: Harvard Crimson, 1928.
 The India Ventures of Fisher Ames, 1794–1804. Proceedings of the American Antiquarian Society New Series 37: 14–23. 1928
 "John Adams and Thomas Jefferson," New England Society of Pennsylvania, 47th Annual Report 1928, 51–67.
 "Squire Ames and Doctor Ames". New England Quarterly I (1928): 5–31.
 "Henry Dunster, First President of Harvard College". Harvard Alumni Bulletin 31 (1928–29): 335–98.
 "Two 'Signers' on Salaries and the Stage". Proceedings of the Massachusetts Historical Society 62 (1928–29): 55–64.
 "Elbridge Gerry, Gentleman–Democrat". New England Quarterly 2 (1929): 6–33.
 "Notes from Maine". American Speech 4 (1929): 356.
 "Ragusa". Proceedings of the Hellenic Travellers' Club (1929): 145–57.
 "Jottings on John Harvard". Harvard Alumni Bulletin 32 (1929–30): 574–79.
 "Remarks" on Charles E. Banks, "Persecution as a Factor in Emigration [of the Puritans]". Proceedings of the Massachusetts Historical Society 63 (1929–30): 151–54.

1930s

 "The Autobiography of Thomas Shepherd with Introduction and Bibliography". Publications of the Colonial Society of Massachusetts 27 (1930): 345–400.
 "History, 1838–1929," with Ephraim Emerson, Samuel Eliot Morison (editor), The Development of Harvard College Since the Inauguration of President Eliot. Cambridge, MA: Harvard University Press, 1930.
 "Sir Charles Firth and Master Hugh Peter, with a Hugh Peter Bibliography". Harvard Graduates' Magazine 39 (December 1930): 121–40.
 "Edward Channing: A Memoir". Proceedings of the Massachusetts Historical Society 64 (1930–32): 250–84.
 "William Pynchon, the Founder of Springfield". Proceedings of the Massachusetts Historical Society 64 (1930–32): 67–107.
 "Review of E.F. Gray's Lief Eriksson". With F.S. Crowley. New England Quarterly 4 (1931): 554–60.
 "Those Misunderstood Puritans". The Forum 85 (March 1931): 142–47.
 "The Course of the Arbella from Cape Sable to Salem". Publications of the Colonial Society of Massachusetts 27 (1932): 285–306.
 "The Great Rebellion in Harvard College and the Resignation of President Kirkland". Publications of the Colonial Society of Massachusetts 27 (1932): 54–112.
 "The Plantation of Nasaway––An Industrial Experiment". Publications of the Colonial Society of Massachusetts 27 (1932): 204–22.
 "Washington, the Man and His Fame". Quebec 7 (1932): 47, 69–70.
 "Academic Seniority in Colonial Harvard". Harvard Alumni Bulletin 25 (1932–33): 576–78.
 "Harvard Degree Diplomas". Harvard Alumni Bulletin 25 (1932–33): 804–13, 907.
 "Francis Bowen, An Early Test of Academic Freedom in Massachusetts". Proceedings of the Massachusetts Historical Society 65 (1932–36): 597–611.
 "Harvard Seals and Arms". Harvard Graduates' Magazine 43 (1933): 1–13.
 "Medicine at Harvard in the Seventeenth Century". Harvard Medical Alumni Bulletin (October 1933).
 "Nathaniel Eaton, First Head of Harvard College". Harvard Graduates' Magazine 61 (1933): 127–42.
 "Needlework Picture Representing a Colonial College Building". Old–Time New England 24 (1933): 67–72.
 "Precedence at Harvard College in the Seventeenth Century" Proceedings of the American Antiquarian Society New Series 42: 371–431. 1933
 "Virginians and Marylanders at Harvard College in the Seventeenth Century". William & Mary College Quarterly Historical Magazine 2d ser. 13 (1933): 1–9.
 "Harvard 'Firsts' and Honorary Degrees". Harvard Alumni Bulletin 36 (1933–34): 1011–12.
 "The Pennoyer Scholarship". Harvard Alumni Bulletin 36 (1933–34): 660–62.
 "The Harvard School of Astronomy in the Seventeenth Century". New England Quarterly 7 (1934): 3–24.
 "Mistress Glover's Household Furnishings at Cambridge, Massachusetts, 1638–1641". Old–Time New England 25 (1934): 29–32.
 "Exhibition of Virginiana in the Widener Library Treasure Room". Harvard Alumni Bulletin 37 (1934–35): 197–99.
 "Harvard and Academic Oaths". Harvard Alumni Bulletin 37 (1934–35): 682–86.
 "The Education of Thomas Parker of Newbury". Publications of the Colonial Society of Massachusetts 28 (1935): 261–67.
 "The Library of George Alcock, Medical Student, 1676". Publications of the Colonial Society of Massachusetts 28 (1935): 350–57.
 "Dunster, Harper and Academic Freedom". Harvard Alumni Bulletin 38 (1935–36): 1206–09.
 "Harvard's Past". Harvard Alumni Bulletin 38 (1935–36): 265–74; The Tercentenary of Harvard College 47–62.
 "The Yard in 1811–1812 and the Old College Pump". With J. Dellinger Barney. Harvard Alumni Bulletin 38 (1935–36): 534–38.
 "The History of Universities". The Rice Institute Pamphlet 23 (1936): 211–82.
 "Harvard College Records" (Introduction). Publications of the Colonial Society of Massachusetts 31 (1936): 9–17, 279–89, 303–6, 325–26, 405–7.
 "Old School and College Books in the Prince Library". More Books 11 (1936): 77–93.
 "Three Oathless Centuries in Massachusetts". Massachusetts Law Quarterly (April 1936).
 "Address at the Tercentenary Celebration". Harvard Alumni Bulletin 39 (1936–37): 13–15; The Tercentenary of Harvard College, 196–99.
 "The 1836 Flags". Harvard Alumni Bulletin 39 (1936–37): 624–26.
 "Historical Register of Harvard University, 1636–1936". Harvard Alumni Bulletin 39 (1936–37): 565–68.
 "Report on Contents of Package Sealed September 8, 1836 and Opened September 8, 1936". Harvard Alumni Bulletin 39 (1936–37): 370–77.
 "Senior Alumnus, Senior Graduate, and Oldest Living Graduate". Harvard Alumni Bulletin 39 (1936–37): 847–49.
 "Tribute to Albert Bushnell Hart". Proceedings of the Massachusetts Historical Society 66 (1936–41): 434–38.
 "The Colonial Rectors of Trinity Church". Trinity Life (Lent 1937): 31–53.
 "The Letter–Book of Hugh Hall". Publications of the Colonial Society of Massachusetts 32 (1937): 514–21.
 "The Reverend Seaborn Cotton's Commonplace Book". Publications of the Colonial Society of Massachusetts 32 (1937): 350–52.
 "The Columbia's Winter Quarters of 1791–92 Located". Oregon Historical Quarterly 39 (1938): 3–7.
 "Discovering the Great Discoverer". New York Times Magazine (9 October 1938): 6–7, 23–26.
 "An American University Quartercentenary". Harvard Alumni Bulletin 51 (1938–39): 40–47.
 "Summer Costume of Harvard Students a Century Ago". Harvard Alumni Bulletin 51 (1938–39): 550.
 "Cruising Hints for the West Indies". Yachting 65 (January–February 1939).
 "Life Resails Columbus's Routes". Life 6 (25 March 1939): 102–06.
 "Texts and Translations of the Journal of Columbus's First Voyage". Hispanic American Historical Review 19 (1939): 235–61.
 "Reports on the Harvard Columbus Expedition". Harvard Alumni Bulletin 42–43 (1939–41).

1940s

 "Charles Morton (1627–98)". Publications of the Colonial Society of Massachusetts (1940): vii–xxix. Introduction to Society's reprint of Morton's Compendium Physicae.
 "Route of Columbus Along the North Coast of Haiti, and the Site of Navidad". Transactions of the American Philosophical Society n.s., 31 (1940): 239–85.
 "Columbus and Polaris". American Neptune 1 (1941): 6–25, 123–37.
 "Review of V. Stefansson's Ultima Thule". Hispanic American Historical Review 21 (1941): 452–56.
 "Capt. Codman on the Mutiny in Dorchester Church and the Seamanship of St. Paul". American Neptune 2 (1942): 99–106.
 "The Colonial Policy of Columbus". Bulletin of the Pan American Union 76 (1942): 543–55.
 "Introduction to the Commonplace Book of Joseph Green, 1675–1715". Publications of the Colonial Society of Massachusetts 34 (1943): 191–96.
 "The Landing at Fedhala, Morocco, November 8, 1942". American Neptune 3 (1943): 99–105; American Foreign Service Journal 2 (1943): 113–16, 156–57.
 "Historical Notes on the Gilbert and Marshall Islands". American Neptune 4 (1944): 87–118; Life (22 May 1944): 90–96+.
 "Memoir of Vice Admiral Theodore S. Wilkinson USN". Alumni Horae Scholasticae 26 (1946): 33–38.
 "The Henry–Crillon Affair of 1812". Proceedings of the Massachusetts Historical Society 49 (1947–50): 207–31.
 "Did Roosevelt Start the War? History Through a Beard". Atlantic Monthly 182 (August 1948): 91–97.
 "Notes on Writing Naval (not Navy) English". American Neptune 9 (1949): 5–10.

1950s

 "Columbus As A Navigator". Studi Colombiani 2 (1951).
 "Faith of a Historian". American Historical Review 56 (1951): 261–75.
 "Prelude to Independence. The Virginia Resolution of May 15, 1776". William & Mary Quarterly 3d ser., 8 (1951): 483–92.
 "Two Minutes That Changed the Pacific War". New York Times Magazine 10 (1 June 1952): 10, 44–47.
 "Sir Winston Churchill, Nobel Prize Winner". Saturday Review 36 (31 October 1953): 22–23; Saturday Review Gallery (New York: Simon & Schuster, 1959): 413–18.
 "Address at a Meeting in Sanders Theatre 27 May, Honoring Harvard Authorities for Defense of Academic Freedom". The Churchman (July 1954): 6–7.
 "The Plymouth Colony and Virginia". Virginia Magazine of History & Biography 62 (1954): 147–65.
 "Plymouth Colony Beachhead". United States Naval Institute Proceedings 80, no. 12 (December 1954): 1345–57.
 "The Formation of the Massachusetts Constitution". Massachusetts Law Quarterly 40 (December 1955): 1–17.
 "The Sea in Literature". Atlantic Monthly 196 (September 1955): 67–71.
 "The Battle That Set Us Free". Saturday Evening Post 229 (7 July 1956): 32–33, 56–59.
 "Christophe Colomb et le Portugal". Boletim de Sociedade de Geografia de Lisboa (1956): 269–78.
 "How to Read Moby Dick". Life 40 (26 June 1956): 57–68.
 "The 66–Day Saga of Mayflower I". New York Times Magazine 28 (14 April 1957): 42–49.
 "Prescott: The American Thucydides". Atlantic Monthly 200 (Nov. 1957): 165–72.
 "Review of George W. Pierson's History of Yale". New England Quarterly 30 (1957): 396–402.
 "The Arms and Seals of John Paul Jones". American Neptune 18 (1958): 301–305.
 "Elba Interlude". Military Affairs 21 (1958): 182–87.
 "The Battle of Surigao Strait". United States Naval Institute Proceedings 84, no. 12 (December 1958): 31–53.
 "The Harvard Presidency". New England Quarterly 31 (1958): 435–46.
 "New Light Wanted on the Old Colony". William & Mary Quarterly 3d ser., 15 (1958): 359–64.
 "The Centenary of Prescott's Death". New England Quarterly 32 (1959): 243–48.
 "Greatest Voyage Ever Made". Saturday Evening Post 231 (3 October 1959): 42–43, 148–53.
 "The Mayflower's Destination and the Pilgrim Fathers' Patents". Publications of the Colonial Society of Massachusetts 38 (1959): 357–413.
 "The Real John Paul Jones". Saturday Evening Post 231 (1 August 1959): 26–27, 55–57.
 "The Willie Jones–John Paul Jones Tradition". William & Mary Quarterly 3d ser., 16 (1959): 198–206.

1960s

 "Reminiscences of Charles Eliot Norton". New England Quarterly 38 (1960): 364–68.
 "Why Japan Surrendered: Excerpt from American Navy in World War II". Atlantic Monthly 206 (October 1960): 41–47.
 "American Strategy in the Pacific Ocean". Oregon Historical Quarterly 62 (1961): 5–56.
 "Lessons of Pearl Harbor". Saturday Evening Post 234 (28 October 1961): 19–27.
 "Peace Convention of February 1961". Proceedings of the Massachusetts Historical Society 73 (1961): 58–80.
 "Wisdom of Benjamin Franklin". Saturday Evening Post 234 (21 January 1961): 21, 76–78.
 "Death of a Kennedy". Look 16 (27 February 1962): 105–112.
 "Guadalcanal". Saturday Evening Post 235 (28 July 1962): 22–23, 62–65.
 "Mr. Lincoln Attends Church". Maryland Historical Magazine 57 (March 1962): 47–55.
 "Pacific Strategy". Marine Corps Gazette 46 (August 1962): 34–40, (September 1962): 34–39.
 "The Principles and Experiences of an Historian". Speech delivered to the Fondation Internationale Balzan in Rome, Italy, 19 May 1963. 
 "The Roosevelt Collection of Naval Art". United States Naval Institute Proceedings 89 (November 1963): 81–96.
 "Six Minutes That Changed the World". American Heritage 14 (February 1963): 50–55, 102–103.
 "Augustus Peabody Loring, Jr". Publications of the Colonial Society of Massachusetts 42 (1964).
 "In Memorium: Perry Miller". New England Quarterly 37 (1964).
 "John Fitzgerald Kennedy". Atlantic Monthly 213 (February 1964): 47–49.
 "The Dry Salvages and the Thacher Shipwreck". American Neptune 25 (1965): 233–247.
 "PPA Press Conference Summary". Publishers World 187 (22 March 1965): 41–43.
 "Sons of Liberty". Reader's Digest 87 (November 1965): 281–286.
 "Arthur Meier Schlesinger" Proceedings of the American Antiquarian Society New Series 76: 227–30. 1967
 "Commodore Perry's Japan Expedition Press and Shipboard Theatre" Proceedings of the American Antiquarian Society New Series 77: 35–43. 1967
 "Our Most Unpopular War". Proceedings of the Massachusetts Historical Society 80 (1968): 38–54.
 "Thoughts on Naval Strategy, World War II". Naval War College Review 20 (March 1968): 3–10.

1970s

 "John Cabot, The Mysterious Sailor Whose Voyages Laid the Basis for English Claims to North America". Smithsonian 2 (April 1971): 12–20.
 "Publishers World Interviews Samuel Eliot Morison". Publishers World 206 (4 November 1974): 6–7.
 "Abigail Adams". Smithsonian 6 (October 1975): 96–97.
 "The Finding Fathers: Which European Discovered America?" European Community No. 192 (January–February 1976): 4–13.

Additional writings
Dictionary of American Biography. American Council of Learned Societies. New York: C. Scribner's sons, 1928–36. For this dictionary, Morison wrote the following biographical articles:
 "Fisher Ames" (vol. 1, pp. 244–46)
 "Benjamin Austin" (vol. 1, pp. 431–42)
 "Peter Chardon Brooks" (vol. 3, p. 83)
 "George Cabot" (vol. 3, pp. 395–96)
 "Arthur Hamilton Clark" (vol. 4, pp. 120–21)
 "Stephen Day" (vol. 5, p. 163)
 "Elbridge Gerry" (vol. 7, pp. 222–27)
 "Albert Bushnell Hart", Supplement 3 (1973), pp. 335–38
 "John Harvard" (vol. 8, pp. 371–72)
 "Leonard Hoard" (vol. 9, pp. 85–89)
 "Edward Johnson" (vol. 10, p. 95)
 "John Thornton Kirkland" (vol. 10, p. 431)
 "John Leverett" (vol. 10, pp. 197–98)
 "Jonathan Loring" (vol. 13, pp. 79–81)
 "Donald McKay" (vol. 13, pp. 72–73)
 "Urian Oakes" (vol. 13, pp. 602–03)
 "Harrison Gray Otis" (vol. 14, pp. 98–100)
 "James Otis" (vol. 14, pp. 101–105)
 "Thomas Parker" (vol. 14, pp. 241–42)
 "William Pynchon" (vol. 15, pp. 292–93)
 "Josiah Quincy" (vol. 15, pp. 308–11)
 "Jared Sparks" (vol. 17, pp. 430–34)
 "Squanto" (vol. 17, p. 487)
 "Theodore Stark Wilkinson", Supplement 4 (1974), pp. 895–96.

References
Notes

Citations

External links
Biography of Samuel Eliot Morison at the Naval History and Heritage Command

Bibliographies by writer
Bibliographies of American writers